Incyte is an American multinational pharmaceutical company with headquarters in Wilmington, Delaware, and Morges, Switzerland.
The company was created in 2002 through the merger of Incyte Pharmaceuticals, founded in Palo Alto, California in 1991 and Incyte Genomics, Inc. of Delaware. The company currently operates manufacturing and R&D locations in North America, Europe, and Asia.

Incyte Corporation currently develops and manufacturers prescription biopharmaceutical medications in multiple therapeutic areas including oncology, inflammation, and autoimmunity.

History
In 2014, Incyte named Hervé Hoppenot president and CEO, and in 2015 he was appointed chairman of the Board of Directors.  Hoppenot had previously served as the president of Novartis Oncology; he had been with Novartis since 2003.

In September 2015, the company announced it had gained exclusive development and commercial right pertaining to Jiangsu Hengrui Medicine Co., Ltd's anti-PD-1 monoclonal antibody, SHR-1210, in a deal worth $795+ million.

In January 2020, Incyte signed a collaboration and license agreement for the global development and commercialization of tafasitamab with MorphoSys. On March 3, 2020, the agreement received antitrust clearance and thus became effective.

Pharmaceuticals
Incyte Corporation currently has seven marketed and co-marketed pharmaceutical products, including Jakafi (ruxolitinib), Pemazyre (pemigatinib), Monjuvi (tafasitamab-cxix) , Opzelura (Ruxolitinib),  Tabrecta (capmatinib), Olumiant (Baricitinib), and Iclusig (ponatinib).

In 2013, Novartis acquired Incyte's c-Met inhibitor capmatinib (INC280,  INCB028060), which is marketed under the brand name Tabrecta.

As of 2014, the company was developing baricitinib, an oral JAK1 and JAK2 inhibitor drug for rheumatoid arthritis in partnership with Eli Lilly. It gained EU approval in February 2017. In April 2017, the US FDA issued a rejection, citing concerns about dosing and safety. In May 2018, baricitinib was approved in the United States for the treatment of rheumatoid arthritis under the brand name Olumiant.

As of 2016 epacadostat, an indoleamine 2,3-dioxygenase (IDO1) inhibitor, was in development for various cancers and was in combination trials with Merck's pembrolizumab (Keytruda) and Bristol Myers Squibb's nivolumab (Opdivo).

References

External links 

American companies established in 1991
Companies based in New Castle County, Delaware
Pharmaceutical companies established in 1991
Companies listed on the Nasdaq
1991 establishments in California
Pharmaceutical companies of the United States
Life sciences industry
Health care companies based in Delaware
1993 initial public offerings